Antonio Marín Molina (born 17 June 1996) is a Spanish footballer who plays for Unionistas. Mainly a right back, he can also play as a central defender.

Club career
Born in Benalúa, Province of Granada, Andalusia, Marín joined UD Almería's youth setup in 2010 at the age of 14, after stints with UCD La Cañada Atlético, Villarreal CF and Granada CF. He made his senior debut with the B-team in the 2013–14 season in Segunda División B, while still a junior.

On 8 January 2014, Marín made his first-team debut, starting in a 1–1 away draw against Racing de Santander for the campaign's Copa del Rey. On 5 December he appeared in his second match, playing the full 90 minutes in a 4–3 win at Real Betis for the same competition.

Marín made his La Liga debut on 8 April of the following year, starting in a 0–4 away loss to FC Barcelona. On 19 June 2015 he signed a new four-year deal with the Rojiblancos, being definitely promoted to the main squad now in Segunda División.

On 21 January 2016, after being rarely used, Marín was demoted to the B-side until the end of the campaign. On 12 August, he joined fellow reserve team Granada CF B in a one-year loan deal.

Marín terminated his contract with Almería on 1 September 2017, and returned to Granada and their reserves the following day.

International career
Marín was called up to the Spain under-16 side in 2012, and later appeared with the under-17s in the 2013 UEFA European Championship qualifying and elite rounds. On 28 January 2014, he was called up to the under-18 team after playing in several matches with the level above, winning the L'Alcúdia International Football Tournament in 2013.

In January 2020, Marín joined SD Ejea on a deal for the rest of the season.

Honours
Spain U19
UEFA European Under-19 Championship: 2015
L'Alcúdia International Football Tournament: 2013

References

External links

1996 births
Living people
Sportspeople from the Province of Granada
Spanish footballers
Footballers from Andalusia
Association football defenders
La Liga players
Segunda División players
Segunda División B players
UD Almería B players
UD Almería players
Club Recreativo Granada players
SD Ejea players
Unionistas de Salamanca CF players
Spain youth international footballers